The 2017 Cornell Big Red football team represented Cornell University in the 2017 NCAA Division I FCS football season as a member of the Ivy League. They were led by fifth-year head coach David Archer and played their home games at Schoellkopf Field. Cornell finished the season 3–7 overall and 3–4 in Ivy League play to tie for fifth place. Cornell averaged 6,793 fans per gam.

Schedule
The 2017 schedule consisted of five home and five away games. The Big Red hosted Ivy League foes Harvard, Brown, and Columbia, and traveled to Yale, Princeton, Dartmouth, and Penn. Homecoming coincided with the game against Brown on October 21.

In 2017, Cornell's non-conference opponents were Delaware of the Colonial Athletic Association, and Colgate and Bucknell of the Patriot League.

Game summaries

Delaware

Yale

Colgate

Harvard

Bucknell

Brown

Princeton

Dartmouth

Columbia

Penn

References

Cornell
Cornell Big Red football seasons
Cornell Big Red football